Muhammad Abdul Hye (26 November 1919 – 3 June 1969) was a Bengali educationist, litterateur, researcher and linguist. He was awarded Bangla Academy Literary Award in 1961 and Ekushey Padak in 1996 by the Government of Bangladesh.

Education and career
Hye passed from Rajshahi High Madrasah in 1936 and completed his intermediate from Dhaka Islamic Intermediate College in 1938. He became the first Muslim student who had obtained first class both in honors and master's examinations in Bengali from the University of Dhaka in 1941 and 1942 respectively. He had joined the Bengali Department of the university in 1949. In 1950, he went to England to study linguistics at the School of Oriental and African Studies of London University. In 1952, he wrote a thesis on "A Phonetic and Phonological Study of Nasal and Nasalization in Bengali" to earn his second MA degree. He served as a visiting professor for ten months at the University of Missouri in the United States in 1968–69.

In 1954, Hye was made Reader and the head of the Bengali department. He became a professor in 1962.

Works
 Sahitya O Sanskriti (literature and culture) (1954)
 Bilete Sare Satsho Din (750 days in England) (1958)
 Toshamod O Rajneetir Bhasha (flattery and the language of politics) (1959)
 Bhasha O Sahitya (language and literature) (1960)
 Dhwanivigyan O Bangla Dhwanitatto (phonetics and Bengali phonology) (1964)

Hye produced Bangla Sahityer Itibritto (history of Bengali literature modern period)  jointly with Syed Ali Ahsan. He produced and published books in association with Ahmed Sharif, Muhammad Mansuruddin, Anisuzzaman and Anwar Pasha.

References

1919 births
1969 deaths
People from Murshidabad district
University of Dhaka alumni
Academic staff of the University of Dhaka
Alumni of SOAS University of London
Recipients of Bangla Academy Award
Recipients of the Ekushey Padak
Pakistani expatriates in the United Kingdom
Pakistani educators
Linguists from Pakistan
Scholars from West Bengal
Linguists from Bengal
Educators from West Bengal
Bengali educators